Turkuaz (Turkish for "turquoise") may refer to:
 Turkuaz Media Group, a Turkish media company
 Isuzu Turkuaz, a midibus model
 RV MTA Turkuaz, a Turkish research and survey vessel
 Turkuaz Airlines, a defunct Turkish charter airline
 Turkuaz (band), American funk band
 Turkuaz campus, a campus of Çankaya University in Turkey

See also
 :tr:Turkuaz (anlam ayrımı), a disambiguation page on Turkish Wikipedia